Peyrelade may refer to:

People 

 Alexis Peyrelade (born 1997), French footballer
 Laurent Peyrelade (born 1970), French football manager and former player

Other uses 

 Château de Peyrelade, ruined castle in France